Fevzi Mostari (also spelled Fawzi or Fowzi; –1747) was a Bosnian writer, who authored the Persian work Bulbulistan ("A Place of Nightingales"; also spelled Bolbolestān) in 1739. Written in imitation of the Golestan of Saadi Shirazi (died 1291/2), it is the only extant prose work in Persian by a writer of Bosnian origin. It is viewed as an important artifact of the Bosnian literary tradition. He was born in Blagaj, near Mostar.

Sources
 
 
 
 

Persian-language writers
Bosnian Muslims from the Ottoman Empire
Writers from Mostar
1670s births
1747 deaths
18th-century writers from the Ottoman Empire
Bosnia and Herzegovina writers
Sufis
Mevlevi Order
Men from the Ottoman Empire
17th-century Bosnian people